Kingsley Widmer (1925–2009) was an American literary critic.

Works 

 The Art of Perversity: D. H. Lawrence's Shorter Fictions (1962, University of Washington Press)
 The Literary Rebel (1965, Southern Illinois University)
 The Ways of Nihilism: A Study of Herman Melville's Short Novels (1970, Ward Ritchie)
 Edges of Extremity: Some Problems of Literary Modernism (1980, University of Tulsa)
 Paul Goodman (1980, Twayne)
 Counterings: Utopian Dialectics in Contemporary Contexts (1988, University of Michigan)
 Defiant Desire: Some Dialectical Legacies of D. H. Lawrence (1992, Southern Illinois University Press)

References

Further reading

External links 

 Full texts at the Internet Archive

1925 births
2009 deaths
Writers from California
American literary critics
University of Wisconsin–Madison alumni
University of Minnesota alumni
University of Washington alumni